Pavel Sukhoi State Technical University of Gomel is a university in Gomel, Belarus. The university is named after Pavel Sukhoi, Belarusian Soviet military aircraft constructor and designer. The University provides training for the graduation of engineering personnel and scientific qualification personnel for such branches of industry as mechanical engineering, metallurgy, power engineering, economy, radio electronic engineering and information technologies.

History 
In 1968, technical faculty was formed at Gomselmash agricultural machinery plant. In 1973 it became Gomel branch of Belarusian State Polytechnical Institute. In 1981 this branch became an independent institute and in 1998 the institute was reformed into technical university.

Faculties
Economics and Humanities Faculty: 
Marketing
Economy and Management at the Enterprise
Economy and Organization of Production (by industries)

Mechanical Engineering Faculty: 
Engineering Technology
Technological Equipment for Machine Building
Hydro-Pneumatic Systems of Mobile and Technological Machines
Development and Operation of Oil and Gas Fields
Automation of Technological Processes and Productions

Technological Faculty: 
Casting Equipment and Technology
Metallurgy Production and Material Working
Equipment and Technology for Material Pressure Shaping
Packing Manufacturing
Design and Manufacture of Farming Equipment

Automation and Information Systems Faculty: 
Industrial Electronics
Automation Electric Drive
Information Systems and Technologies
Information Science and Programming Technologies
Information Technologies and Control in Engineering Systems

Power Engineering Faculty: 
Electric Power Supply
Electric Power Systems and Networks
Industrial Heat Power Engineering
Operation of Electric Power Equipment of Organizations

Living and recreation 
The international students are provided with double or 3 bed rooms provided with all necessary facilities in students' hostels of block type.

References 

Universities in Belarus
Gomel
Buildings and structures in Gomel Region
1968 establishments in the Soviet Union
Educational institutions established in 1968